There are three languages spoken in the Torres Strait Islands: two indigenous languages and an English-based creole.  The indigenous language spoken mainly in the western and central islands is Kalaw Lagaw Ya, belonging to the Pama–Nyungan languages of the Australian mainland. The other indigenous language spoken mainly in the eastern islands is Meriam Mir: a member of the Trans-Fly languages spoken on the nearby south coast of New Guinea and the only Papuan language spoken on Australian territory. Both languages are agglutinative; however Kalaw Lagaw Ya appears to be undergoing a transition into a declensional language while Meriam Mìr is more clearly agglutinative. Yumplatok, or Torres Strait Creole, the third language, is a non-typical Pacific English Creole and is the main language of communication on the islands.

Kalaw Lagaw Ya 

The language of the western and central islands of Torres Strait is related to languages of the Australian mainland and is a member of the Pama–Nyungan family of languages, which covers most of Australia. This language is known by its dialect names: Kalau Lagau Ya, Kalau Kawau Ya, Kulkalgau Ya and Kaiwaligau Ya (this latter also called Kowrareg, which is from the mid-19th century Kowrareg dialect form kauraraiga/kaurarega 'islander'. Kalau Lagau Ya is often called Kala Lagaw Ya in the literature. From here on it is known as Kalau Lagau Ya as per the High Court Decision on 7 August 2013.

Sydney Ray's "Linguistics"  and Rod Mitchell's "Ngalmun Lagaw Yangukudu" are the main descriptions of the language. Ray contains a vocabulary list of both Mabuiag (as called by the Cambridge Expedition) and Meriam Mìr. In 2001 and 2003, Ron Edwards published the Torres Strait Languages vocabularies of Sydney H. Ray.  This is the only dictionary available for use by Torres Strait Islanders and people who want to teach, learn and speak the Torres Strait languages. Unfortunately, neither the Ray work nor his vocabularies are very good, and contain many mistakes. The dictionaries can only be used in conjunction with knowledgeable native speakers to point out errors and corrections.

The four dialects of the Kalau Lagau Ya are very close to each other, somewhat like Standard American and Standard Australian English are to each other.  Its vocabulary is potentially 80% non-Australian; much of the non-Australian content is Papuan (Trans-Fly) and Austronesian (South-East Papuan ).  It is an interesting language in having feminine and masculine gender, though no neuter gender [this is typical among Australian languages that have gender as well as many of the neighbouring Papuan languages] – and the difference is semantically significant in that many words can be masculine or feminine according to inherent reference or culturally significant reference.  For example, za as masculine means 'an important topic/subject', and as feminine is 'thing, object'. Gœiga when masculine means 'sun', and when feminine means 'day'.

Meriam Mir 

The language of eastern Torres Strait is Meriam Mìr. This is a Papuan language and is related to the languages of the nearby coast of Papua New Guinea. Meriam Mir is the only Papuan language indigenous to Australia, and used to have two dialects, Erubim Mìr and Meriam Mir.

Both languages are strictly speaking mixed languages, Meriam Mìr having some Australian/Kalaw Lagaw Ya influence as well as Austronesian.  It is probably the case that Meriam Mìr settlers 'overlaid' Kalaw lagaw ya speakers on the Eastern islands (these non-Meriam people who have always been resident on the Eastern Islands are called Nog Le 'Common People', Lawrie).

Torres Strait Creole 

The third language of the Torres Straits is a creole that developed from Torres Strait Pidgin English, the earliest records of which date to the mid 1800s, though creolisation started in the 1880s at the earliest. This Torres Strait Creole is also known as Blaikman Tok, Broken/Brokan and Yumplatok.  It has five dialects – Papuan, Western-Central, Eastern, TI and Cape York.

Sign language

Both languages have signed forms, though they are not reported to be particularly well-developed compared to other Australian Aboriginal sign languages.

Examples 

The table below shows how some example phrases differ in the Torres Strait languages. Kalau Kawau Ya,  Kala Lagau Ya, Kulkalgau Ya and Kaiwaligau Ya, 'old' Kaiwaligau Ya are the dialects of Kalau Lagau Ya.

References 

Agglutinative languages
Languages of Australia
Torres Strait Islands culture